Camillo is a southeastern suburb of Perth, Western Australia. Its local government area is the City of Armadale and it was part of Kelmscott until 1978. It was named after Camillo Cyrus, the child of Gertrude Seeligson, a local property owner in the area in 1901. Until mid-2008, it was named Westfield, named after a siding on the Jandakot railway line.

Schools
Westfield Park Primary School (1970)
 Grovelands Primary School (1980).
 John Wollaston Anglican Community School (1988) - K–12.

References

External links

Suburbs of Perth, Western Australia
Suburbs in the City of Armadale